In sociology and other social sciences, internalization (or internalisation) means an individual's acceptance of a set of norms and values (established by others) through socialisation.

John Finley Scott described internalization as a metaphor in which something (i.e. an idea, concept, action) moves from outside the mind or personality to a place inside of it. The structure and the happenings of society shapes one's inner self and it can also be reversed.

The process of internalization starts with learning what the norms are, and then the individual goes through a process of understanding why they are of value or why they make sense, until finally they accept the norm as their own viewpoint. Internalised norms are said to be part of an individual's personality and may be exhibited by one's moral actions. However, there can also be a distinction between internal commitment to a norm and what one exhibits externally. George Mead illustrates, through the constructs of mind and self, the manner in which an individual's internalizations are affected by external norms.

One thing that may affect what an individual internalises are role models. Role models often speed up the process of socialisation and encourage internalization: if someone an individual respects is seen to endorse a particular set of norms, the individual is more likely to be prepared to accept, and so internalise, those norms. This is called the process of identification. Internalization helps one define who they are and create their own identity and values within a society that has already created a norm set of values and practices for them.

To internalise is defined by the Oxford American Dictionary as to "make (attitudes or behavior) part of one's nature by learning or unconscious assimilation: people learn gender stereotypes and internalize them." Through internalization individuals accept a set of norms and values that are established by other individuals, groups, or society as a whole.

Lev Vygotsky, a pioneer of psychological studies, introduced the idea of internalization in his extensive studies of child development research. Vygotsky provides an alternate definition for internalization, the internal reconstruction of an external operation. He explains three stages of internalization:
 An operation that initially represents an external activity is reconstructed and begins to occur internally.
 An interpersonal process is transformed into an intrapersonal one.
 The transformation of an interpersonal process into an intrapersonal one is the result of a long series of developmental events.

See also

 Externalization
 Introjection

References

Conformity
Sociological terminology